"Nina Never Knew" is a popular song with music by Louis Alter and lyrics by Milton Drake, published in 1952.

Recordings that charted in 1952 were by the Sauter-Finegan Orchestra on RCA Victor Records (number 13 on the Billboard charts; first entered on December 20) and by Johnny Desmond on Coral Records (number 19; first entered on November 1).

Recorded versions

Jonny Abeles
Kenny Ball
Tony Brent
Les Brown
Budapest Radio Orchestra
Vic Damone
Johnny Desmond
Barry Galbraith
Bill Easley
Chuck Hedges
Eddie Higgins
Jack Jones
Steve Jordan
King Sisters - Warm And Wonderful
Matt Monro - Here's To My Lady
Joe Mooney
John Pizzarelli
Johnny Richards
Jimmy Rowles
Sauter-Finegan Orchestra
George Shearing
Frank Sinatra
The Singers Unlimited
Nancy Wilson

References

Songs with music by Louis Alter
Songs with lyrics by Milton Drake
Nancy Wilson (jazz singer) songs
1952 songs